The National Library of Thailand is the legal depositary and copyright library for Thailand. It was officially established on 12 October 1905, after the merger of the three existing royal libraries, and is one of the oldest national libraries in Asia. It operates under the jurisdiction of the Fine Arts Department of the Ministry of Culture in Bangkok, Thailand.

, the library in Bangkok housed over three million items and had 11 provincial branches. Its budget was 87 million baht and it employed about 200 staff.

Background 

The National Library of Thailand's main tasks are collecting, storing, preserving, and organizing all national intellectual property regardless of medium. Collections include Thai manuscripts, stone inscriptions, palm leaves, Thai traditional books, and printed publications as well as audio-visual materials and digital resources.  The library is a national information resource serving citizens nationwide.

The National Library has a long history. Its precursor was the Phra Vajirayana Royal Library which was established in 1883, by sons and daughters of King Mongkut (Rama IV) to honor their royal father. Later in 1897, King Chulalongkorn returned from his European visit and expressed his desire to dedicate the Vajirayana Library to the Capital.   
In 1905, three libraries, the Mandira Dharma Library, the Vajirañāṇa Library, and the Buddhasasana Sangaha Library, were amalgamated at the command of King Chulalongkorn and renamed the "Vajirañāṇa Library for the Capital City".  The library has remained under royal patronage since that date. In 1933, after democratic reforms, the Fine Arts Department was established and assumed administration of the Vajirañāṇa Library by royal degree. It was subsequently renamed the "National Library". In 1966, the National Library was relocated to Samsen Road in Bangkok and is now administered by the Ministry of Culture.

Outline history

Mission statement 
 Collect, catalog, and research national intellectual property.
 Develop standards for the storage and preservation of national intellectual property.
 Create and augment the value of national intellectual property.
 Develop systems for rendering services to the diverse users of the library.
 Develop systems to manage the nation's intellectual property heritage.

References

External links
 Review and photographs inside the National Library, edited by Bangkok Library website

1905 establishments in Siam
Thailand
Thai culture
Sub-departmental government bodies of Thailand
Buildings and structures in Bangkok
Libraries established in 1905
Libraries in Thailand
Deposit libraries
Fine Arts Department (Thailand)